Amanda 'Mandy'  Drennan (born 22 May 1988 in Cowes, Victoria
) is a Paralympic swimming competitor from  Australia.  She was born without her right leg. She learned to swim as a child on Victoria's Phillip Island but trained in Melbourne several times a week due to the island's lack of facilities.  At the age of ten, she competed in her first state championships and a year later represented Australia at the Pacific School Games. In 2000, she was offered a wildcard entry at the 2000 Sydney Paralympic Games but her family and coach decided it was not in her long-term development to accept it.

She competed in the 2002 IPC Swimming Championships in Mar Del Plata, Argentina winning a gold medal in the women's 4 × 100 m medley relay and silver medal in the women's 4 × 100 m freestyle relay. She held an Australian Institute of Sport Paralympic swimming scholarship from 2003 to 2004.  She won a bronze medal at the 2004 Athens Games in the Women's 4 × 100 m Freestyle 34 pts event. She competed at the 2008 Beijing Games and did not win a medal.

In 2005, she won the Bass Coast Sportsperson of the Year award. In 2011, she swam 66 km around Phillip Island in a shark cage to raise funds to re-establish Warley Hospital on the Island. Her mother was a nurse at the centre when it closed in 2007.
She works as pharmacist in Melbourne.

References

Female Paralympic swimmers of Australia
Swimmers at the 2004 Summer Paralympics
Paralympic bronze medalists for Australia
Australian Institute of Sport Paralympic swimmers
1988 births
Living people
Medalists at the 2004 Summer Paralympics
Paralympic medalists in swimming
Australian female freestyle swimmers
Australian female medley swimmers
S9-classified Paralympic swimmers